Great Mills High School is a comprehensive public high school in Great Mills, Maryland, United States. It serves students in grades 9–12 in the mixed rural and suburban area at the confluence of the Potomac River, Patuxent River, and Chesapeake Bay. It belongs to the St. Mary's County Public Schools system, and is associated with two other county high schools: Leonardtown High School and Chopticon High School. The school is accredited by the Middle States Colleges and Secondary Schools and the Maryland State Department of Education.

The school has an enrollment of more than 1,600, with an ethnic makeup reflecting the community: 51% Caucasian, 40% African American, 5% Asian, 4% Hispanic, 1% other. Many of the families are employed by NAS Patuxent River, government contractors, St. Mary's College of Maryland, and others involved in the area's traditional agricultural and water-related businesses.

Great Mills High School is among the oldest continually operating school in St. Mary's County and the State of Maryland. It was founded in 1929 as one of the original high schools in the county. The campus now encompasses several acres and has a football, soccer, and field hockey field and uses a county pool next door.

The school houses a STEM program.

Great Mills High School athletes are known as the Hornets. Great Mills High School Athletics belongs to the Southern Maryland Athletic Conference and competes in Division 3A in state competitions.

2018 shooting
On March 20, 2018, 17-year-old student Austin Rollins opened fire in a hallway at the school with a 9mm Glock handgun, fatally wounding 16-year-old student Jaelynn Willey before exchanging fire with school resource officer Blaine Gaskill, who had responded to the scene. Gaskill, 34, was a six-year veteran of the St. Mary's County Sheriff's Office trained in special weapons and tactics. A 14-year-old student, Desmond Barnes, was wounded, while Rollins was shot and later died at the hospital. Authorities later determined that Rollins died from a self-inflicted gunshot to the head.

The perpetrator, Rollins, was previously in a relationship with Willey. The gun Rollins used was legally owned by his father, according to the St. Mary's County Sheriff's Office. Willey was taken off life support on March 22, 2018, after being declared brain dead.

Notable alumni
 Clifford Dukes (class of 2000) – Arizona Rattlers defensive lineman
 Roy Dyson (class of 1966) – Maryland State Senator representing Maryland District 29: Calvert, Charles, and St. Mary's County
 Toby Morse (class of 1988) – punk vocalist of H2O
 John F. Slade III – former member of the Maryland House of Delegates
 Tubby Smith (class of 1969) – Former head basketball coach at Texas Tech University. Former head Coach of University of Minnesota's men's basketball team. Former coach of University of Kentucky's men's basketball team
 Tanya Hughes (class of 1990) - Track and Field University of Arizona 4x NCAA High Jump Champion.  Member of 1992 US Olympic team in Barcelona, Spain.

References

External links

 

Educational institutions established in 1929
Public high schools in Maryland
Schools in St. Mary's County, Maryland
1929 establishments in Maryland